Rafael Surenovich Safarov (8 November 1947 – 26 May 2019) was a Russian football coach and a player.

Safarov died of a long-illness in Moscow on 26 May 2019 at the age of 71.

References

External links
 

1947 births
Footballers from Tbilisi
2019 deaths
Soviet footballers
Association football defenders
Association football forwards
FC Dinamo Tbilisi players
FC Lokomotivi Tbilisi players
FC Ararat Yerevan players
FC Dinamo Batumi players
FC Shakhtar Horlivka players
FC Lori players
Soviet Top League players
Soviet football managers
Russian football managers
FC Anzhi Makhachkala managers
FC Dynamo Makhachkala players